Brazilian football champions are the winners of the highest league in Brazilian football, which since 1971 is considered the national championship. In 2010, the Brazilian Football Confederation additionally recognized the winners of the Taça Brasil (1959–68) and the Torneio Roberto Gomes Pedrosa (1967–70) as Brazilian football champions.

Taça Brasil (1959–1968)

Torneio Roberto Gomes Pedrosa (1967–1970)

Campeonato Brasileiro (1971–present)

Campeonato Nacional de Clubes (1971–1974)

Copa Brasil (1975–1979)

Taça de Ouro (1980–1983)

Copa Brasil (1984)

Taça de Ouro (1985)

Copa Brasil (1986–1988)

 Most known as Copa União. (*)

Campeonato Brasileiro Série A (1989–1999)

Copa João Havelange (2000)

Campeonato Brasileiro Série A (2001–present)

Notes

Taça Brasil and Torneio Roberto Gomes Pedrosa titles are only officially recognized by CBF in 2010.
Flamengo has claimed the title of the 1987 Campeonato Brasileiro (Copa União), for having won the Green Module, organized by Clube dos 13, who refused to play against the Yellow Module winners, organized by CBF. However, the club lost in all instances, thus the only officially recognized champion being Sport Recife.
In 2020, after partnering with the energy drinks company Red Bull, CA Bragantino has changed their name to "Red Bull Bragantino" (or RB Bragantino) the same how did it happened with RB Leipzig and RB Salzburg.

Winners

Performance by club
Seventeen clubs are officially recognized to have been the Brazilian football champions. In bold those competing in Série A as of 2023 season.

Performance by state

See also
List of Brazilian women's football champions
Triple Crown of Brazilian Football

References

External links
Brazil - List of Champions, RSSSF.com

Champions
Champions
Brazil
Taça Brasil
Torneio Roberto Gomes Pedrosa
Football